KKYR-FM (102.5 MHz) is a country music-formatted radio station licensed to serve Texarkana, Texas. It is currently under the ownership of Townsquare Media. Studios are located along Arkansas Boulevard on the Arkansas side of the city, and the transmitter is on the Texas side, in the western portions of the city south of Westlawn Drive.

History
The station first signed on the air on July 15, 1965, as KOSY-FM. Beginning in the 1970s, it was an adult contemporary format. The format continued throughout the 1980s and the early portion of the 1990s as "Y102", and was Shreveport's dominant affiliate for Rick Dees Weekly Top 40. KOSY-FM became KKYR in 1989 but retained its adult contemporary format until 1990 when it became the station's current country format.

External links
KKYR-FM official website

KYR-FM
Country radio stations in the United States
Townsquare Media radio stations
Radio stations established in 1965
1965 establishments in Texas